Opiza was a medieval Georgian monastery and cathedral church located in historical Klarjeti region, now in Artvin Province, Turkey. It is one of the oldest Georgian churches in the Tao-Klarjeti region. Opiza was reconstructed after an Arab invasion in the 8th century. It is referred to by many Georgian historical persons, such as Gregory of Khandzta, Beqa and Beshqen Opizrebi.

References

Georgian churches in Turkey
Buildings and structures in Artvin Province